Tim Sanders (born 6 January 1986 in Wehl) is a footballer who plays as a centre back for SV DFS in the Dutch Hoofdklasse Saturday B. He formerly played for the German SV Hönnepel-Niedermörmter. He is a youth product from SV Concordia-Wehl and De Graafschap.

References

External links
 Voetbal International profile 
 

1986 births
Living people
Dutch footballers
Association football defenders
Eerste Divisie players
Derde Divisie players
Achilles '29 players
People from Doetinchem
Footballers from Gelderland